Erigeron oreades is an Asian species of flowering plants in the family Asteraceae. It grows on slopes and meadows in Xinjiang, Mongolia, Kazakhstan, and Siberia.

Erigeron oreades is a perennial herb up to 25 cm (10 inches) tall, forming a slim underground rhizomes. Its flower heads have pale purple ray florets surrounding yellow disc florets.

References

oreades
Flora of Asia
Plants described in 1842